Karl Magnus Johansson (born 15 December 1969) is a Swedish handball coach and was the head coach of Romanian women handball club CSM București.

Coaching achievements

Club
Swedish Handball Division – women:
Winner: 1997, 2009, 2010, 2011, 2012 
Swedish Handball League – men:
Winner: 1998, 2000, 2001, 2003  
EHF Cup Winners' Cup – men:
Finalist: 2003

National team
European Championship – women's tournament:
Silver Medalist: 2010

References

 

1969 births
Living people
Sportspeople from Gothenburg
Swedish handball coaches
Swedish expatriates in Denmark
Swedish expatriates in Norway
Swedish expatriate sportspeople in Romania